The following is an incomplete list of Portugal wars and battles from the County to modern Portugal.

County of Portugal (868-1139)

Kingdom of Portugal (1139–1910)

First Portuguese Republic (1910-1926)

Second Portuguese Republic (1933-1974)

Portugal (1974-present)

Notes

References

Portugal
Wars
Wars